Twisted Wheel is the eponymous debut studio album by English indie rock band Twisted Wheel. It was released on 13 April 2009 to mixed reviews in the music world, however it did provide them with a following throughout the UK. The singles that have been released are "Lucy the Castle", "She's a Weapon", "We Are Us" and "You Stole the Sun". Many of the songs on the album have become live favourites of the band. The album gave them a few celebrity fans, including Liam Gallagher, and they supported many heavyweight UK indie bands during the time of the album's release, including Oasis, Kasabian, The View and The Enemy.

Track listing
 Lucy The Castle (2:46)
 She's A Weapon (1:52)
 We Are Us (3:29)
 Oh What Have You Done (2:59)
 Strife (4:20)
 One Night On The Streets (2:33)
 Let Them Have It All (3:12)
 Bad Candy (2:58)
 You Stole The Sun (3:51)
 Bouncing Bomb (3:34)
 What's Your Name (3:57)

2009 albums
Twisted Wheel (band) albums